Khinalug (also spelled Khinalig, Khinalugi, Xinalug(h), Xinaliq or Khinalugh) is a Northeast Caucasian language spoken by about 3,000 people in the villages of Khinalug and Gülüstan, Quba in the mountains of Quba Rayon, northern Azerbaijan. It forms its own independent branch within the Northeast Caucasian language family.

Khinalug is endangered, and classified as "severely endangered" by UNESCO's Atlas of the World's Languages in Danger.

History 
Khinalug is the language of the village Khinalug in the Quba district of Azerbaijan. It has been tentatively classified by previous researchers as a member of the Lezgian family of the Dagestani branch of Northeast Caucasian languages Although Khinalug is the official language of the village, it is mostly spoken by villagers in informal circumstances, while the national language Azerbaijani is used formally for educational purposes and to communicate with non-Khinalug speakers. Khinalug is considered to be a threatened language. In recent years, the road leading to the villages where it is spoken has fallen into disrepair, leaving the area mostly isolated.

Phonology
The Khinalug language previously had its own script. 
Alexander Kibrik and a team of 13 linguists from Moscow State University visited the village in 2005. 
In 2007 they developed a Latin orthography for Khinalug, in collaboration with local school teachers in the village. It is presented in italics on the tables below.

Consonants 
{| class="wikitable IPA" style="text-align:center"
|+Consonants
|-
! colspan="2" |
!Labial
!Dental
!Postalveolar
!Palatal
!Velar
!Uvular
!Pharyngeal
!Glottal
|-
! colspan="2" |Nasal
| [m] m|| [n] n
| 
|
| 
| 
|
|
|-
! rowspan="4" |Plosive
! voiceless lenis
| [p] p|| [t] t
| 
|
| [k] k
| [q] q
|
| [ʔ] ʔ
|-
!voiceless fortis
| [pː] pp|| [tː] tt
| 
|
| [kː] kk
| [qː] qq
|
|
|-
! voiced
| [b] b|| [d] d
| 
|
| [ɡ] g
| 
| 
|
|-
!ejective
| [pʼ] p'|| [tʼ] t| 
|
| [kʼ] k'''
| 
|
|
|-
! rowspan="4" |Affricate
! voiceless lenis
|  || [t͡s] c| [t͡ʃ] ç|
|[k͡x] kx 3|[q͡χ] x̂|
|
|-
!voiceless fortis
|  || [t͡sː] cc| [t͡ʃː] çç|
| 
| 
|
|
|-
! voiced
|
|
|[d͡ʒ] j|
|
|
|
|
|-
!ejective
|  || [t͡sʼ] c
| [t͡ʃʼ] ç'|
| 
|[q͡χʼ] q'|
|
|-
! rowspan="2" |Fricative
! voiceless
| [f] f|| [s] s| [ʃ] ş|
| [x] kh 2| [χ] x|[ħ] hh 4| [h] h|-
! voiced
| [v] v| [z] z| [ʒ] z̧1|
|[ɣ] gh 2| [ʁ] ğ|[ʕ] ʕ 4|
|-
! colspan="2" |Trill
| 
| [r] r| 
|
| 
| 
| 
|
|- align="center"
! colspan="2" |Approximant
| 
| [l] l| 
|[j] y| [w] w| 
|  ||
|}1 The cedilla in the orthography is in the middle of the bottom of the <z>, as is typical of Russian linguistics.

2 Kh and gh are rare.

3 Kx is very rare.

4 The pharyngeal sounds mostly appear in Arabic loanwords.

 Vowels 

Khinalug has nine vowels and four diphthongs. 

Diphthongs include: [iu] [ui] [oe] [oa].

Vocabulary
The following words were phonetically transcribed from Khinalug:

Note: ı is roughly pronounced as the e in "fallen". u is roughly pronounced as the ou in "coup".

 Alphabet 

See also
Khinalug people
Lists of endangered languages
List of endangered languages in Asia

References

Further reading
Clifton, John M.; Deckinga, Gabriela; Lucht, Laura; Mak, Janfer; Tiessen, Calvin, Authors. 2005. "The Sociolinguistic Situation of the Khinalug In Azerbaijan."
Desheryev, Ju. D. 1959. Grammatika xinalugskogo jazyka. Izdatel'stvo Akademii Nauk SSSR, Moscow.
Hewitt, George. 2004. Introduction to the Study of the Languages of the Caucasus. LINCOM, Munich. p. 29.
Kibrik, Aleksandr E. 1972. Fragmenty grammatiki xinalugskogo jazyka. Izdatel'stvo Moskovskogo Universiteta, Moscow.
Kibrik, Aleksandr E. 1994. "Khinalug". In: The Indigenous Languages of the Caucasus'', vol. 4; Rieks Smeets (ed.); Caravan Books, Delmar (New York). pp. 367–406.

External links

Appendix:Cyrillic script
Khinalug basic lexicon at the Global Lexicostatistical Database
Khinalug tongue&culture
New Khinalug alphabet

Northeast Caucasian languages
Languages of Azerbaijan
Endangered Caucasian languages
Language
Quba District (Azerbaijan)